Vanzau is a village in the Champhai district of Mizoram, India. It is located in the Khawbung R.D. Block.

Demographics 

According to the 2011 census of India, Vanzau has 149 households. The effective literacy rate (i.e. the literacy rate of population excluding children aged 6 and below) is 87.16%.

References 

Villages in Khawbung block